Bart Exposito (born 1970, in Texas, US) is an artist based in Los Angeles. He paints geometric images in a graphic design style.

Exposito's work has appeared in a number of shows including “Game Over” at Galerie Grimm/Rosenfeld in Munich and “Wake Up & Apologise” at the Hayworth Gallery, Los Angeles.  He has exhibited internationally at galleries such as Studio 9, London and Galerie Fur Gegenwarstkunst, Bremen.

External links
Review in Artforum, Summer, 2002.
Further information and images from the Saatchi Gallery

1970 births
Living people
20th-century American painters
American male painters
21st-century American painters
Artists from Texas
20th-century American male artists